Aluminium 7150 alloy is a heat treatable wrought alloy. It is used in the aerospace industry for manufacturing aircraft components. Heat treatment can improve its anti-corrosion properties with a low corresponding decrease in strength.

Chemical composition

Properties

Alternate designations 
It has the following alternate designations:
 AA 7150 
 AMS 4252A
 4306A
 4307S
 4345A
 UNS A97150

References

External links
 
 http://www.icaa-conference.net/ICAA12/pdf/P046.pdf
 https://www.researchgate.net/publication/240427022_Hot_deformation_behavior_of_7150_aluminum_alloy_during_compression_at_elevated_temperature
 https://www.researchgate.net/publication/286794197_Mechanical_properties_and_exfoliation_behavior_of_7150-RRA_aluminum_alloy_retrogressed_at_175C
 https://inis.iaea.org/search/search.aspx?orig_q=RN:44025414

Aluminium alloy table 

Aluminium–zinc alloys